Griga United is a Belizean football team based in Dangriga in Belize. The club was founded in 1994 as the Dangriga Jaguars and is founded by Timothy Flores and co owner Frank Castillo. The team play at the Carl Ramos Stadium.

Coaches
 Pablo Cacho (2004)

References

External links

Football clubs in Belize
Association football clubs established in 1994
1994 establishments in Belize